Yacine Chalel (born 17 November 1995) is an Algerian racing cyclist. He rode in the men's points race and scratch at the 2020 UCI Track Cycling World Championships.

Major results

2016
 African Track Championships
2nd  Points race
2nd  Keirin
2017
 Arab Track Championships
2nd  Omnium
2nd  Points race
2018
 1st  Scratch race, African Track Championships
2019
 2nd  Madison, Arab Track Championships
 African Track Championships
3rd  Points race
3rd  Scratch race
3rd  Omnium
2020
 African Track Championships
2nd  Points race
3rd  Scratch race
3rd  Omnium
2021
 African Track Championships
2nd  Scratch race
2nd  Madison (with Lotfi Tchambaz)
2nd  Team pursuit (with Lotfi Tchambaz, Youcef Reguigui and Yacine Hamza)
3rd  Points race
3rd  Elimination race
2022
 African Track Championships
1st  Madison (with Lotfi Tchambaz)
1st  Poimts race
1st  Team pursuit (with Lotfi Tchambaz, El Khacib Sassane and Hamza Megnouche)
2nd  Omnium

References

External links

1995 births
Living people
Algerian male cyclists
Algerian track cyclists
Cyclists from Paris
21st-century Algerian people
20th-century Algerian people